Night Birds is a 1930 British-German thriller film directed by Richard Eichberg and starring Jack Raine, Muriel Angelus and Jameson Thomas. A separate German language version, The Copper, was made at the same time.

Cast
 Jack Raine as Sgt. Harry Cross
 Muriel Angelus as Dolly Mooreland
 Jameson Thomas as Deacon Lake
 Eve Gray as Mary Cross
 Franklyn Bellamy as Charlo Bianci
 Garry Marsh as Archibald Bunny
 Frank Perfitt as Inspector Warrington
 Hay Petrie as Scotty
 Harry Terry as Toothpick Jeff
 Margaret Yarde as Mrs. Hallick
 Ellen Pollock as Flossie
 Cyril Butcher as 'Dancer' Johnny
 Barbara Kilner as Mabel

References

External links

1930 films
Films of the Weimar Republic
1930s thriller films
Films shot at British International Pictures Studios
British multilingual films
Films directed by Richard Eichberg
British black-and-white films
German black-and-white films
German thriller films
British thriller films
1930 multilingual films
1930s English-language films
1930s British films
1930s German films